Georg C. F. Greve (born 10 March 1973 in Helgoland, Germany) is a software developer, physicist, author and currently co-founder and president at Vereign. He has been working on technology politics since he founded the Free Software Foundation Europe (FSFE) in 2001.

Greve has been working full-time as president for FSFE since early 2001. In June 2009, he handed over the presidency of the FSFE to Karsten Gerloff. His responsibilities for FSFE included coordination of the general assembly, supporting local representatives in their work, working on political and legal issues as well as projects and giving speeches or informing journalists to spread knowledge about free software.

In addition, Georg Greve also worked as a consultant, representing Google in the OOXML standardisation process at ISO and as a project reviewer for the European Commission.

Greve is married and lives in Switzerland.

In 2010 Greve was awarded the Cross of Merit on ribbon of the Federal Republic of Germany (Verdienstkreuz am Bande).

Career 

Greve has a degree of Physics in biophysics, with physical oceanography and astronomy as minor fields of study from the computer science department of the University of Hamburg. His interdisciplinary diploma thesis was written in the field of nanotechnology on scanning probe microscopy.

Greve's first software development was when he was 12 years old. His first publication of a program was in a professional journal in 1992. He partly financed his studies when he managed the software development to evaluate SQUID-sensor data in the biomagnetometic laboratory at the University Medical Center Hamburg-Eppendorf in Hamburg, Germany.

In 1993 he came across free software, the GNU Project and Linux. In 1998, he was the European speaker for the GNU Project and began writing the "Brave GNU World", a monthly column on free computer software featuring interesting GNU projects each month. It was published on the Internet in as many as ten languages, and in international printed magazines including the German Linux-Magazin. The name Brave GNU World is a reference to Aldous Huxley's novel Brave New World.

In early 2001, he initiated the Free Software Foundation Europe (FSFE or FSF Europe), the first Free Software Foundation outside the United States of America and, the only transnational Free Software Foundation. Greve was invited as an expert to the “Commission on Intellectual Property Rights” of the UK government, and represented the coordination circle of German civil society during the first phase of the United Nations (UN) World Summit on the Information Society (WSIS) as part of the German governmental delegation. He has also networked with civil society working groups at the European level as well as for the thematic working group on patents, copyrights, trademarks (PCT) and free software.

Between 2010 and 2017, he was CEO as well as president and, later, member of the board for Kolab Systems AG in Küsnacht, Switzerland, the developers of the Kolab server. In late 2017, Greve co-founded a company called Vereign to enable authentic communication through blockchain federated networks with Claus H. Bressmer.

References

External links

 Georg Greve's Blog
 Fellowship interview with Georg Greve about background of FSFE (March 2009)
 Transcript of a video interview during the UN WSIS Contributory Conference on ICT & Creativity
 Video and audio recordings of Greve's introduction to the 3rd international GPLv3 conference, 22 June 2006
 2007 pre-FOSDEM interview
 Georg Greve's FSFE Team Page

Copyright activists
Free software programmers
GNU people
1973 births
Living people
University of Hamburg alumni
Recipients of the Cross of the Order of Merit of the Federal Republic of Germany